Valeriia Zoria (born 23 April 1987) is a Ukrainian handball player for HC Gomel and the Ukrainian national team.

References

1987 births
Living people
Ukrainian female handball players
Sportspeople from Kyiv
Expatriate handball players in Turkey
Yenimahalle Bld. SK (women's handball) players
Ukrainian expatriate sportspeople in Turkey